The X Factor Thailand is reality television music competition to find new singing talent, contested by aspiring singers drawn from public auditions. It was first aired on September 1, 2017 and runs every Monday at 8:15 p.m. after broadcasting 3 episodes on Friday at 9:00 p.m.

Format

Categories
The show is primarily concerned with identifying singing talent, though appearance, personality, stage presence and dance routines are also an important element of many performances. Each judge is assigned one of four categories: "Boys", "Girls", "Over 30s", and "Groups" (including duos). Through the live shows, the judges act as mentors to their category, helping to decide song choices, styling and staging, while judging contestants from other categories.

Stages
There are five stages to the competition:
 Stage 1: Auditions (these auditions decide who will sing in front of the judges)
 Stage 2: Boot camp
 Stage 3: Four-chair challenge
 Stage 4: Judges' houses
 Stage 5: Semi final
 Stage 6: Live shows (finals)

Hosts and Judges

About auditions

Series overview
 Contestant in (or mentor of) "Boys" category
 Contestant in (or mentor of) "Girls" category
 Contestant in (or mentor of) "Over 30s" category
 Contestant in (or mentor of) "Groups" category

External links
 The X Factor Thailand at Facebook

References

Television series by Workpoint Entertainment
2010s Thai television series
2017 Thai television series debuts
Thai-language television shows
Thai music television series
Music competitions in Thailand
Thai television series based on British television series
Workpoint TV original programming